Northeastern Region is one of the traditional eight regions of Iceland, located in the north of the island. The biggest town in the region is Akureyri, with a population of 17,300.

External links